Shining Cliff Woods are on the west bank of the River Derwent near to Ambergate Derbyshire.

In medieval times "Schymynde-cliffe" was one of the seven royal parks within Duffield Frith and, as such, belonged to Edmund Crouchback, Earl of Lancaster. It was an estate within the manor of Alderwasley and in 1284 was given to William Foun who was given the job of maintaining the boundaries between the Pendleton and Peatpits Brooks.

They passed to Thomas Lowe by marriage in 1471 and in 1514 he was granted by Henry VIII the right to "empark and empale" his estate and enjoy "free warren" within it.

The woods include an SSSI.  Some of the woodland is owned and managed by Grith Fyrd Pioneers, but the Eastern part is (like Alport Height some 2 km to the west),  in the ownership of the National Trust, and part of their South Peak Estate. This woodland is managed by  Forestry England.

The woods contain a popular residential centre, once managed by the Youth Hostels Association but managed independently since 2009. The hostel stands in the lee of the Shining Cliff itself, a low gritstone rockface.

To the east of Shining Cliff Wood stands Oakhurst House, a 19th-century Jacobean-Arts & Crafts country home which has fallen into partial ruin. It was built by Francis Hurt, landowner and resident of local Alderwasley Hall. The house is in private ownership and not accessible to the public.

References

Sites of Special Scientific Interest in Derbyshire
Forests and woodlands of Derbyshire